Dirty Work – The Album is the debut studio album by American singer-songwriter Austin Mahone, released on 18 October 2017 by AM Music and Mr. 305 Inc. through Universal Music Japan. It was only released in Japan. The album features guest appearances from Bobby Biscayne, Juicy J, Pitbull, 2 Chainz & Hardwell.

Background and promotion
Since 2017, Japanese comedian Blouson Chiemi started to use "Dirty Work" as the background music of her popular comedy routine, which led the song to peak number 4 on the Japan Hot 100 Chart, also ending up being certified gold in the country. Later, Mahone announced the release of his debut studio album exclusively in the country. It also included his collaborations "Lady" with Pitbull and "Creatures of the Night" with Hardwell which reached the number 1 position on Billboard's US Dance Club Songs chart.

Mahone also released the song "Perfect Beauty" on September 20, 2017, along its music video, exclusively in Japan. The song was featured in a commercial for the Japanese shampoo "Moist, Diane." The album's release day, Mahone put out on digital platforms and streaming services two countdown songs internationally: "I Don't Believe You" and "Found You".

Track listing
Credits taken from My Sound.

Charts

References

2017 debut albums
Austin Mahone albums
Albums produced by her0ism